GMM 120 (Guided Mortar Munition 120; known as Patzmi; also referred to as Morty) is a GPS and/or laser-guided mortar munition, which was developed by Israel Military Industries.

References

Mortar munitions
Military equipment of Israel